This is a list of villages in Udupi district, Karnataka state, India, organized by taluk  the 2011 Census of India. At that time, the district had three taluks, Karkal, Kundapura and Upudi. Since then, four more taluks have been created, Byndoor, Brahmavara, Kaup, and Hebri. The 2021 Census of India has been postponed due to the COVID-19 pandemic in India, so these new taluks are not yet reflected in the census.

Karkal taluka 

 Ajekar
 Andaru
 Attur
 Bailoor
 Bajagoli
 Belenje
 Belman
 Bola
 Chara
 Durga
 Eedu
 Hebri
 Hermunde
 Hirgana
 Inna
 Irvathuru
 Jarkala
 Kabbinale
 Kadthala
 Kallya
 Kanajaru
 Kanthavara
 Kedinje
 Kerebettu
 Kervashe
 Kodange
 Kowdoor
 Kuchchur
 Kukkuje
 Kukkundoor
 Mala
 Marne
 Miyar
 Mudar
 Mudrady
 Mulladka
 Mundkuru
 Nadpalu
 Nallur
 Nandalike
 Neere
 Ninjoor
 Nitte
 Nooralbettu
 Padukudoor
 Palli
 Parappady
 Renjala
 Shirlal
 Shivapura
 Sooda
 Varanga
 Yellare
 Yennehole
 Yerlapady

Kundapura taluka 

 Ajri
 Albadi
 Aloor
 Amasebailu
 Ampar
 Anagalli
 Asodu
 Badakere
 Balkur
 Basrur
 Beejadi
 Bellal
 Beloor
 Belve
 Bijoor
 Byndoor
 Chittoor
 Devalkunda
 Edmoge
 Gangolli
 Gantihole
 Gavali
 Golihole
 Gopadi
 Gujjadi
 Gulvadi
 Hadavu
 Hakladi
 Halady
 Hallady-Harkadi
 Hallihole
 Halnad
 Hangaloor
 Harady
 Hardally-Mandally
 Harkoor
 Hattiangadi
 Hemmadi
 Hengavalli
 Heranjal
 Heroor
 Heskathoor
 Hombady-Mandadi
 Hoovinakere
 Hosadu
 Hosangadi
 Hosoor
 Idurkunhadi
 Jadkal
 Japthi
 Kalavara
 Kalthodu
 Kamalashile
 Kambadakone
 Kandavara
 Kanyana
 Karkunje
 Kattabelthoor
 Kavrady
 Kedoor
 Kemmannu
 Kenchanoor 
 Keradi
 Kergal
 Kirimanjeshwar
 Kodladi
 Kollur
 Koni
 Korgi
 Kulanje
 Kumbashi
 Kundabarandadi
 Machattu
 Madammakki
 Maravanthe
 Molahalli
 Mudoor
 Nada
 Nagodi
 Nandanavana
 Navunda
 Noojadi
 Paduvari
 Rattadi
 Senapur
 Shankaranarayana
 Shedimane
 Shiroor
 Siddapur
 Tallur
 Thagarasi
 Thekkatte
 Thombattu
 Trashi
 Ulloor 74
 Ulloor [11]
 Ulthoor
 Uppinakudru
 Uppunda
 Vakwadi
 Vandse
 Yedthare
 Yedyadi-Mathyadi
 Yeljith

Udupi taluka 

 108 Kalthur
 33 Shiroor
 34 Kudi
 38 Kalthur
 41 Shiroor
 92 Heroor
 Achalady
 Adamaru
 Anjaru
 Aroor
 Athradi
 Avarse
 Badanidiyur
 Baikady
 Bairampalli
 Balkudru
 Bankerkatta
 Bannady
 Bellampalli
 Bellarpadi
 Belle
 Belpu
 Billadi
 Bommarabettu
 Brahmavar
 Chanthar
 Cherkady
 Giliyar
 Haluvalli
 Handady
 Hanehalli
 Haradi
 Havanje
 Heggunje
 Hejamadi
 Herga
 Herady
 Hiliyana
 Hirebettu
 Hiriadka
 Hosala
 Hosoor
 Innanje
 Irody
 Kachur
 Kadur
 Kakkunje
 Kallianpur
 Kapu
 Katapady
 Kattingere
 Kavadi
 Kemundel
 Kenjoor
 Kodi
 Kodibettu
 Kotathattu
 Kote
 Kudi
 Kukkehalli
 Kukkikatte
 Kumragod
 Kunjarugiri
 Kurkalu
 Kuthpady
 Kuthyar
 Majoor
 Manoor
 Marne
 Matpady
 Mattu
 Moodahadu
 Mudarangadi
 Muloor
 Nadur
 Nalkur
 Nanchar
 Nandicoor
 Neelavar
 Padebettu
 Padoor
 Padu
 Pajaka
 Palimar
 Pandeshwara
 Pangala
 Pejamangoor
 Perdoor
 Pernankila
 Pilar
 Santhoor
 Shankarapura
 Shiriyara
 Shirva
 Tenka
 Thopanangadi
 Tonse West
 Uchila
 Uliargoli
 Uppoor
 Vaddarse
 Vandar
 Yedthady
 Yellur
 Yermal

References 

 
Udupi